Denticulobasis dunklei is a species of damselfly in the family Coenagrionidae first identified in Loreto, Peru.

References

Coenagrionidae
Insects described in 2009